Jimmy McKinney (born August 23, 1983) is an American professional basketball player and film actor.

Basketball career
McKinney attended Vashon High School in St. Louis, Missouri.  He was the leading scorer on Vashon's 2001 and 2002 basketball teams, both of which won Missouri state championships. He later received a full scholarship to play college basketball at the University of Missouri.
Since his graduation McKinney plays for the Frankfurt Skyliners. Since five seasons 2006 to 2011, he plays for the Frankfurt Skyliners, a basketball team in the Germany-1 Bundesliga, reaching the German Bundesliga Semifinals in 2008 and the German Bundesliga Cup Semifinals in 2009. McKinney currently plays for s.Oliver Baskets in the Bundesliga. On December 8, 2014 he signed with Tigers Tübingen.

Coaching career
McKinney was hired as the head coach of the boys basketball team at Kirkwood High School in St. Louis on July 24th, 2020.

Acting career
Most notably, McKinney also landed a lead role of Jacob Whitmore, a basketball player in the 2009 film Streetballers, the debut feature movie of director Matthew Scott Krentz.

References

External links
 
 Jimmy McKinney player page in University of Missouri Tigers site
 Streeballers official site
 Jimmy McKinney player page in Frankfurt Skyliners site

1983 births
Living people
American expatriate basketball people in Germany
American male film actors
Basketball players from St. Louis
Missouri Tigers men's basketball players
Parade High School All-Americans (boys' basketball)
Skyliners Frankfurt players
S.Oliver Würzburg players
Telekom Baskets Bonn players
American men's basketball players
Shooting guards